Steve Shibuya is an American screenwriter. He co-wrote the screenplay for the 2011 film Sucker Punch, along with director Zack Snyder.

References

External links

American male screenwriters
Living people
Place of birth missing (living people)
Year of birth missing (living people)